This is a list of ambassadors of the United States to Gabon.

Gabon had been an overseas territory of France since 1910. At that time it became part of French Equatorial Africa, which included Middle Congo (now Republic of the Congo), Chad, and Oubangui-Chari (now Central African Republic). Gabon achieved its independence as the Gabonese Republic on August 17, 1960.

The United States immediately recognized the new Gabonese Republic and moved to establish diplomatic relations. The new U.S. embassy in Brazzaville, Republic of the Congo, had been established two days earlier on August 15. The current resident in Brazzaville, Alan W. Lukens, was commissioned also to Gabon and presented his credentials to the government on August 17. W. Wendell Blancke was appointed as the first ambassador on December 12, 1960. He served concurrently as the ambassador to Gabon, Central African Republic, Chad, and the Republic of the Congo while resident in Brazzaville.

During Blanke’s tenure as non-resident ambassador, the embassy in Libreville was established March 20, 1961, with Walker A. Diamanti as Chargé d’Affaires ad interim. In September 1961 the first ambassador was appointed solely for Gabon. In 1975 the ambassador to Gabon was also accredited to the newly independent nation of São Tomé and Príncipe.

The U.S. Embassy in Gabon is located in Libreville.

Ambassadors

Notes

See also
Gabon – United States relations
Foreign relations of Gabon
Ambassadors of the United States

References
United States Department of State: Background notes on Gabon

External links
 United States Department of State: Chiefs of Mission for Gabon
 United States Department of State: Gabon
 United States Embassy in Libreville

Gabon
Main
United States